Pak Jong-hyeon (born 15 September 1938) is a former South Korean cyclist. He competed in the individual road race and team time trial events at the 1960 Summer Olympics.

References

External links
 

1938 births
Living people
South Korean male cyclists
Olympic cyclists of South Korea
Cyclists at the 1960 Summer Olympics
Sportspeople from Seoul
20th-century South Korean people
21st-century South Korean people